is a town located in Tokachi Subprefecture, Hokkaido, Japan.

As of September 2016, the town has an estimated population of 5,742 and a density of 7 persons per km2. The total area is 816.38 km2.

The region hosts the rocket launch site for Interstellar Technologies, the Taiki Aerospace Research Field, which is a JAXA facility.

Climate

Mascot

She is a bright and gentle cosmos flower fairy. She usually ends her sentences with "pi" (ぴ). Her dream is to join JAXA. Her birthday is October 1.

References

External links

Official Website 

Towns in Hokkaido